Wuliangye is a Chinese baijiu liquor made from proso millet, maize, glutinous rice, long-grain rice and wheat. Although the formula was developed during the Ming dynasty (1368–1644), the name Wuliangye was given to it in 1905. Since 1959, the formula has been nationalized and standardized. Wuliangye Yibin is the drink's propriety maker and one of the largest baijiu manufacturers in China. 

During the 2019 sales promotion event Singles' Day, Wuliangye sold baijiu products for a reported  on online shopping platform Tmall.

References

Chinese brands
Chinese alcoholic drinks
Sichuan cuisine